is a train station in the city of Ōgaki, Gifu Prefecture, Japan operated by the Central Japan Railway Company (JR Tōkai).

Lines

Layout
Arao Station has one side platform serving a single bi-directional line. The station is unattended.

Adjacent stations

|-
!colspan=5|Central Japan Railway Company

History
Arao Station opened on December 1, 1930. The station was absorbed into the JR Tōkai network upon the privatization of the Japanese National Railways (JNR) on April 1, 1987.

Surrounding area
Mikubi Jinja

See also
 List of Railway Stations in Japan

External links

Railway stations in Japan opened in 1930
Railway stations in Gifu Prefecture
Tōkaidō Main Line
Stations of Central Japan Railway Company
Ōgaki